The Salt Fire was a wildfire that burned  in the Lakehead area north of Shasta Lake in Shasta County, California in the United States during the 2021 California wildfire season. The fire was first reported on Wednesday, June 30, 2021, and it was fully contained on July 19, 2021. The fire destroyed forty-one structures, including twenty-seven residences and fourteen outbuildings, and damaged four additional outbuildings. Although the cause remains under investigation, officials from the Shasta–Trinity National Forest believe that the fire was likely sparked by hot material that fell from a vehicle on Interstate 5 and landed in dry brush next to the freeway.

Events
The fire was first reported in the early afternoon of Wednesday, June 30, at around 1:40 pm PST burning east of Interstate 5 in the Gilman Road area near the Salt Creek exit and immediately caused a shutdown of the freeway as the fire rapidly expanded. Rural neighborhoods in the surrounding areas were placed under mandatory evacuation orders as the fire reportedly exploded to over 200 acres by 3:25 pm. Exacerbated by a protracted heatwave that remained over the Pacific Northwest, the abnormally dry native brush created by significant drought conditions allowed for critical fire spread on the Salt Fire as several other severe wildfires had ignited throughout the northern California area during the week-- including the nearby Lava and Tennant Fires. In the early hours of the fire, residents on Gregory Creek Road were urged to shelter in place or go to Gregory Creek Beach to shelter in-place. By 6:30 pm, the fire had been estimated to be around 1,000 acres and remained zero percent contained as it burned north and east into unincorporated forestland.

On the following day of Thursday, July 1, investigators suggested that the cause of the fire had been attributed to a vehicle that had been traveling north on Interstate 5.  Existing evacuation orders remained in place as the fire's size had expanded to encompass some estimated 4,500 acres by 6 pm. At that point, firefighting personnel remained in the initial attack phase of the response and had not begun to assess containment of the fire, nor the extent of the structure damage caused by the fire. 

Throughout the following days, the fire would burn deeper into the forest north and east of Lakehead and eventually begin to move into the footprints of wildfires that had burned in the area several years prior. These fires included the two significant incidents dubbed the Hirz Fire and Delta Fire which had scarred the area during the fire season of 2018. Firefighters prioritized securing the west side of the fire by building containment lines near the Interstate in order to keep the freeway open. The fire reached full containment on July 19.

Impact

Closures and evacuations 
Residents living east of the I-5 freeway in the Lakehead area were forced to evacuate due to the fire, including people living along Gilman Road, Gregory Creek Road, and Antlers Road. An evacuation center was set up at Central Valley High School in Shasta Lake.

The fire forced the shutdown of Interstate 5 shortly after the fire was first reported on June 30, although by the next day both directions of the freeway were open. Numerous roads around Lakehead were closed, and as the fire expanded on the east side of the freeway, the area of the Shasta–Trinity National Forest surrounding the fire was closed to recreation to protect public safety.

Damage 
The Salt Fire  destroyed 41 structures, including 27 residences and 14 outbuildings. It also damaged an additional four outbuildings. A number of homes along Gregory Creek Road were destroyed by the morning after the fire started, giving residents only minimal time to escape the expanding fire.

Gallery

See also
2021 California wildfires

References 

2021 California wildfires
June 2021 events in the United States
Wildfires in Shasta County, California
Wildfires in California